Castiglioni is an Italian surname. People with this surname include:

 Giannino Castiglioni (1884–1971), Italian artist
 Achille Castiglioni (1918–2002), Italian architect and industrial designer
 Livio Castiglioni (1911–1979), Italian architect and industrial designer
 Pier Giacomo Castiglioni (1913–1968), Italian architect and industrial designer

 Francesco Saverio Castiglioni (1761–1830), Pope Pius VIII
 Goffredo da Castiglione / Godfrey Castiglioni (died 1241), Pope Celestine IV
 St. Buono Castiglioni (818–822), Bishop of Milan
 St. Honoratus Castiglioni (568–572), Bishop of Milan

 Arturo Castiglioni (1874–1952), Italian-American medical historian
 Camillo Castiglioni (1879–1961), Austrian financier and banker
 Consuelo Castiglioni, b. 1959, Chilean-Italian fashion designer
 Luis Alberto Castiglioni Soria, former vice president of Paraguay
 Niccolò Castiglioni (1932–1996), Italian composer and pianist

See also 
 Palazzo Castiglioni (disambiguation)
 The Castiglioni Brothers (film)
 Castigliano 
 Castiglione (disambiguation)
 Castiglione (surname)
 Via Fratelli Castiglioni (street in Milan named after Achille, Livio, and Pier Giacomo Castiglioni)

Italian-language surnames